Tachina asiatica is a species of fly in the genus Tachina of the family Tachinidae that is endemic to India. It is found in such Indian provinces as Himachal Pradesh and Uttar Pradesh.

References

Insects described in 1918
Diptera of Asia
Endemic fauna of India
asiatica